Degtyaryov Plant (English: Open Joint Stock Company "V. A. Degtyaryov Plant") or ZiD (Zavod imeni Dеgtyaryovа) is one of the most important weapon and vehicle producing enterprises of Russia.

Degtyaryov Plant is a subsidiary of High Precision Systems (Rostec).

History
Founded in Kovrov in 1916, the firearms plant has been supplying Russian and Soviet armed forces with weapons ever since. Weapons such as the Degtyaryov anti-tank rifle (PTRD-41), the Degtyaryov machine gun, the Shpagin submachine gun (PPSh-41) and the Goryunov heavy machine gun (SG-43 Goryunov) were created at the plant.

In 1989 it was the fourth largest motorcycle producer in the Soviet Union.

Production

Presently the Degtyaryov Plant is producing revolvers,  machine guns, aircraft guns, anti-aircraft guns, anti-tank guns and rocket systems.

Products
KSVK 12.7 sniper rifle
PTRD-41
KPV heavy machine gun
Kord machine gun
RPD
PKM
PPSh-41
PKP Pecheneg machine gun
AEK rifle series
AGS-30
DP-64
AEK-919K "Kashtan"
RPG-7V2
SP81 flare gun
RGS-50M grenade launcher

The plant also makes a range of civilian products: motorcycles (i.e. Voskhod), mopeds, micro-tractors, sewing machines and accumulator batteries.

References

External links

 The official site
 The motorcycle division (in Russian)

Manufacturing companies established in 1916
Firearm manufacturers of Russia
Motorcycle manufacturers of the Soviet Union
Motorcycle manufacturers of Russia
Defence companies of the Soviet Union
High Precision Systems
Companies based in Vladimir Oblast
Russian brands
1916 establishments in the Russian Empire